Lucius Henry O'Brien (13 August 1842 – 25 September 1913) was Dean of Limerick from 1905 to 1913.

Biography
He was the son of William Smith O'Brien. He was born on 13 August 1842 and educated at St Columba's College and Trinity College, Dublin. He was ordained in 1867; and after a curacy in Mere held incumbencies at Ramelton and then Adare before his elevation to the Deanery.

He died on 25 September 1913.

Notes

1842 births
People educated at St Columba's College, Dublin
Alumni of Trinity College Dublin
Deans of Limerick
1913 deaths